Álvaro Gabriel Pintos Fraga (born 24 October 1977 in Montevideo) is a Uruguayan football striker. He currently plays for Club Atlético Torque on loan from C.A. Cerro.

External links
 Profile at BoliviaGol.com 
 
 Profile at PersianLeague.com 

1977 births
Living people
Association football forwards
Uruguayan footballers
Uruguayan expatriate footballers
Sportivo Cerrito players
C.A. Bella Vista players
Central Español players
Peñarol players
C.A. Cerro players
Liga MX players
Club Universitario de Deportes footballers
Irapuato F.C. footballers
Rah Ahan players
Cobresal footballers
Club Real Potosí players
C.D. Jorge Wilstermann players
Montevideo City Torque players
Expatriate footballers in Argentina
Expatriate footballers in Bolivia
Expatriate footballers in Chile
Expatriate footballers in Peru
Expatriate footballers in Mexico
Expatriate footballers in Iran
Uruguayan expatriate sportspeople in Argentina
Uruguayan expatriate sportspeople in Bolivia
Uruguayan expatriate sportspeople in Chile
Uruguayan expatriate sportspeople in Peru
Uruguayan expatriate sportspeople in Mexico